Heliconius aoede, the Aoede longwing, is a species of butterfly of the family Nymphalidae. It was described by Jacob Hübner in 1813. It is found in the Amazon basin. The habitat consists of deep forests.

The larvae feed on Dilkea and Mitostemma species.

Subspecies
Listed alphabetically:
H. a. aoede (Brazil)
H. a. aliciae (Neukirchen, 2000) (Ecuador)
H. a. astydamia (Erichson, [1849]) (Guyana)
H. a. auca (Neukirchen, 1997) (Ecuador)
H. a. ayacuchensis Neukirchen, 1992 (Venezuela)
H. a. bartletti (Druce, 1876) (Peru, Colombia)
H. a. centurius Neukirchen, 1994 (French Guiana)
H. a. cupidineus Stichel, 1906 (Peru)
H. a. emmelina (Oberthür, 1902) (Guyana)
H. a. eurycleia Brown, 1973 (Brazil: Mato Grosso)
H. a. faleria Fruhstorfer, 1910 (Brazil: Mato Grosso)
H. a. lucretius (Weymer, 1891) (Brazil: Amazonas)
H. a. manu Lamas, 1976 (Peru)
H. a. philipi Brown, 1976 (Bolivia)

References

 Neruda aoede at Insecta.pro

Butterflies described in 1813
Heliconius
Fauna of Brazil
Nymphalidae of South America
Taxa named by Jacob Hübner